Maurice Tompkin (17 February 1919 – 27 September 1956) was an English sportsman who played first-class cricket with Leicestershire and professional football for Bury, Leicester City, Huddersfield Town and Kettering Town. He was born in Countesthorpe, Leicestershire.

He played as a middle-order batsman for Leicestershire from 1938 to 1956, scoring over 1000 runs a season from 1946 to 1955. After his most productive season, 1955, when he scored 2190 runs, he was selected to tour Pakistan with the Marylebone Cricket Club (MCC) in 1955–56. However, he suffered ill-health when he returned, and died in hospital from pancreatic cancer after an operation. His highest score was 186 for Leicestershire against the touring Pakistan team in 1954.

References

External links
CricketArchive: Maurice Tompkin
 Maurice Tompkin at Cricinfo

1919 births
1956 deaths
Deaths from pancreatic cancer
English footballers
Association football forwards
English Football League players
Bury F.C. players
Leicester City F.C. players
Huddersfield Town A.F.C. players
Kettering Town F.C. players
English cricketers
Leicestershire cricketers
Marylebone Cricket Club cricketers
People from Countesthorpe
Footballers from Leicestershire
Cricketers from Leicestershire
Players cricketers
North v South cricketers
T. N. Pearce's XI cricketers
Deaths from cancer in the United Kingdom